KLNK may refer to:

 Kalanaur Kalan railway station, Haryana, India (station code KLNK)
 Lincoln Airport (Nebraska) (ICAO code KLNK)
 KLNK-LD, a low-power television station (channel 2, virtual 48) licensed to serve Groveton, Texas, United States